Fragment Factory is an independent record label and mail-order house based in Hamburg, Germany, founded in 2009 by Michael Muennich (*1980). The label specializes in releasing experimental electronic music in the broadest sense, including Electro-acoustic music, Sound Art, Noise and its several sub-categories. The output of Fragment Factory has been published on different formats, such as cassette, vinyl, CD / CD-R and comprises works by international sound artists from the US, Canada, Asia, UK & Europe.

Selected Discography 

 [FRAG46] Christina Kubisch - Schall und Klang CD (2019)
 [FRAG45] Antoine Chessex - Subjectivation LP (2018)
 [FRAG41] Eryck Abecassis & Francisco Meirino - La Gueule Du Loup CD (2017)
 [FRAG39] Alice Kemp - Fill My Body With Flowers And Rice LP (2016)
 [FRAG36] Leif Elggren - Das Baank LP (2016)
 [FRAG32] Enema Syringe - Upshutlenvolte 7" (2014)
 [FRAG29] Schimpfluch-Gruppe - Nigredo C46 cassette (2013)
 [FRAG26] Aaron Dilloway & Tom Smith - Allein Zu Zweit C48 cassette (2013)
 [FRAG23] Joachim Montessuis - Chapel Perilous LP (2012)
 [FRAG20] John Duncan / Michael Esposito / Z'EV - There Must Be A Way Across This River/The Abject LP (2011)
 [FRAG19] GX Jupitter-Larsen & Muennich - Die Arbeiter Von Wien 7" (2011)
 [FRAG16] Michael Esposito & Kevin Drumm - The Icy Echoer 7" (2010)
 [FRAG10] Circuit Wound - They Thrive In Complacency C20 cassette (2010)
 [FRAG09] Yoshihiro Kikuchi - Texts' Absence / Optical Gloom / Audible Lights C40 cassette (2010)
 [FRAG07] Dried Up Corpse - Nothing From Nothing C20 cassette (2010)
 [FRAG06] Bryan Lewis Saunders & Raymond Dijkstra - Le Bobcat C40 cassette (2010)

References

External links 
 Official label website
 Fragment Factory online store
 Fragment Factory on Discogs
 Fragment Factory on Facebook
 Website of label founder and operator Michael Muennich

Noise music record labels
Experimental music record labels
German independent record labels